Kirchhoff, Kirchoff or Kirchhoffer is a German surname. Notable people with the surname include:

 Adolf Kirchhoff (1826–1908), German classical scholar and epigrapher
 Alfred Kirchhoff (1838–1907), German geographer and naturalist
 Alphonse Kirchhoffer (1873–1913), French Olympic fencer
 Charles William Henry Kirchhoff (1853-1916), American editor and metals expert
 Detlef Kirchhoff (born 1967), German rower
 Fritz Kirchhoff (1901–1953), German screenwriter, film producer and director
 Gustav Kirchhoff (1824–1887), German physicist — Kirchhoff's laws in electricity, spectroscopy, thermochemistry
 Gottlieb Kirchhoff (1764–1833), German chemist
 Jan Kirchhoff (born 1990), German footballer
 John Nesbitt Kirchhoffer (1848–1914), Canadian politician
 Mary Kirchoff (born 1959), American fantasy novelist
 Paul Kirchhoff (1900–1972), German anthropologist and ethnologist of pre-Columbian Mesoamerican cultures
 Robert Kirchhoff (born 1962), Slovak film director
 Richard A. Kirchhoffer (1890–1977), bishop of the Episcopal Diocese of Indianapolis
 Ulrich Kirchhoff (born 1967), German show jumper

See also
 10358 Kirchhoff, a main-belt asteroid
 Kirchhoff (crater), the lunar crater named for Gustav Kirchhoff 
 Kirchhoff Institute of Physics, a research institute in Heidelberg, Germany
 Kirchhoff's laws, a group of laws of physics (in thermodynamics, electrical circuits, spectroscopy, and fluid mechanics) named for Gustav Kirchhoff
 Kirchhoff's theorem, in graph theory, a theorem concerning the number of "spanning trees" in a graph, named for Gustav Kirchhoff

Kirchhof (disambiguation)

German-language surnames